Tecate Peak is a mountain in San Diego County in the U.S. state of California. Tecate Peak is four miles west of Tecate, Baja California, and is about 1/2 mile north of the United States-Mexico border.

Tecate Peak is also known as Kuuchamaa (also spelled Kuchamaa, Cuchuma, and Cuchama) Mountain, and is a sacred mountain for the indigenous Kumeyaay people.

References

External links 
 

Mountains of San Diego County, California
Mountains of Southern California
Religious places of the indigenous peoples of North America